Malta participated in the 1964 Summer Paralympics in Tokyo, Japan. The country sent a delegation of two male athletes. C. Markham competed in both athletics (shot put) and snooker, while G. Portelli competed in snooker.

In the shot put (B category), Markham finished fourth (out of five contenders), with a throw of 6.40m. W. Prossl took gold for Germany, with a world record throw of 7.69m.

In snooker, the two Maltese competitors finished joint third, each winning bronze, while Michael Shelton took the gold medal for Great Britain.

Malta's two bronze medals constitute its second best result at the Paralympics to date, after its silver and two bronze in 1960.

Malta did not participate in the 1964 Summer Olympics, also held in Tokyo.

Medallists

References

Nations at the 1964 Summer Paralympics
1964
Paralympics